Mohamed Fakhri Mahmoud Mahmoud Ramadan (born March 4, 1999) is an Egyptian footballer. He plays as an attacking midfielder for Egyptian Premier League club Al Ahly.

References

1999 births
Living people
Egyptian footballers
Egypt international footballers
Al Ahly SC players
Association football midfielders